David S. Wall FRSA FAcSS is Professor of Criminology at the Centre for Criminal Justice Studies, School of Law, University of Leeds, England, where he researches and teaches cybercrime, policing, organised and transnational crime and intellectual property crime. He rejoined the University of Leeds in August 2015 from Durham University, where he was Professor of Criminology. Between 2011 and 2014 he was Head of the School of Applied Social Sciences (SASS). Before moving to Durham in 2010 he was Professor of Criminal Justice and Information Society at the University of Leeds, where he also held the position of Head of the School of Law (2005–2007) and Director of the Centre for Criminal Justice Studies (2000–2005). He is a Fellow of the Alan Turing Institute.

Research
Wall's specialist area of research is crime and information technology, particularly with regard to policing and cybercrime, organised crime and intellectual property crime (counterfeiting). He has a sustained track record of conducting sole and collaborative research projects for the EU, AHRC, ESRC, EPSRC, Nuffield, Home Office, Law Society and many others. He is currently conducting various interdisciplinary research projects into Cybercrime and Cybersecurity (RIUK (formerly RCUK) with various partners). The first is 'Cybercrime in the Cloud' – Critical (EPSRC/ESRC – EP/M020576/1) (with Newcastle and Durham Universities) – for further information see the Northern Cloud Crime Centre website. The second is 'Ransomware and Crimes of Extortion' (Emphasis – Economical, Psychological and Societal Impact of Ransomware) (ESPRC/ESRC – EP/P011772/1) with Kent, De Montfort, City and Coventry universities. The third is 'Organized crime and terror networks Takedown' – (Horizon 2020 – Grant 700688)(with 19 European universities and agencies). He has finished projects on Organised Crime (FP7) with Transcrime (Università Cattolica del Sacro Cuore of Milan and the University of Trento)); Policing Cybercrime; and Counterfeit pharmaceuticals. He recently completed a partnership with Transcrime and the CNRS, (Sorbonne, Paris) looking at "Public and Private Partnerships for Reducing Counterfeiting of Fashion Apparels and Accessories" as part of the EU Aegis Programme Framework 6.

He is currently working on projects regarding celebrity and law and on policing cybercrime. His recent publications have been on the organization of cybercrime, policing cybercrime, copyright trolling, and 'online micro-frauds', which include, amongst other offences, scareware, click fraud and phishing.

A selection of pre-print versions of his articles and working papers can be found on the SSRN site and in The Conversation. Further information can be found on his University of Leeds website.

Publications
His publications include 12 books on his various research topics and 55 or more articles, chapters and reports.

His books are as follows:

 Wall, D.S. and Williams, M.L. (2014) (eds) Policing Cybercrime: Networked and Social Media Technologies and the Challenges for Policing, 150+x pp.
 Stallion, M. and Wall, D.S. (2012) The British Police: Forces and Chief Officers 1829 -2012, Second Edition, Bramshill: Police History Society, pp. 362.
 Wall, D.S. (ed.) (2009) Crime and Deviance in Cyberspace, Aldershot: Ashgate (International Library of Criminology and Penology). 575 + xxx pp..
 Wall, D.S. (2007) Cybercrime: The transformation of crime in the information age, Cambridge: Polity. 276+xii,  (hard back),  (paper back).
 Wall, D.S. (ed.) (2003) Cyberspace Crime, Aldershot: Dartmouth/ Ashgate (Dartmouth International Library of Criminology and Penology). 582 + xxvi pp..
 Wall, D.S. (ed.) (2001) Crime and the Internet, London: Routledge. 221 + xi pp. (paper back), (0415244285) (hard back).
 Ryan, M., Savage, S. and Wall. D.S. (eds) (2001) Policy Networks in Criminal Justice, London: Palgrave Macmillan, 226 + xv pp..
 Akdeniz, Y., Walker, C.P. and Wall. D.S. (eds) (2000) The Internet, Law and Society, London: Longman, 388 + xx pp..
 Stallion, M. and Wall, D.S. (1999) The British Police: Police Forces and Chief Officers 1829 -2000, Bramshill: Police History Society, 269 + iv pp..
 Wall, D.S. (1998) The Chief Constables of England and Wales: The socio-legal history of a criminal justice elite, Aldershot: Dartmouth, 341 + xi pp..
 Young, R. and Wall, D.S. (eds) (1996) Access to Criminal Justice: legal aid, lawyers and the defence of liberty, London: Blackstone Press, 376 +xiv pp..
 Bottomley, A.K. Coleman, C. Dixon, D. Gill, M.L. and Wall, D.S. (1991) The Impact of PACE: Policing in a Northern Force, Hull: Hull University, 198 + vi pp..

Wall is currently on the editorial board of the European Journal on Criminal Policy and Research (Springer) and The Security Journal (Palgrave).
He was previously on the editorial board of The British Journal of Criminology (Oxford University Press), Policing and Society (Taylor and Francis), Criminal Justice Matters (Taylor and Francis). He is an associate editor of International Review of Law, Computers and Technology (Taylor and Francis).

Other works
Aside from work into Cybercrimes and Criminal Justice, Wall also has an interest in popular cultures. He once played bass in the Fabulous Salamanders and then the 1980s folk rock group God's Little Monkeys (formerly Malcolm's Interview) with whom he recorded 3 albums: Breakfast in Bedlam (Topic Records, 1988); New Maps of Hell (Cooking Vinyl, 1989); LIP (Cooking Vinyl, 1991). Within his academic portfolio of work he has written articles on celebrity cultures and intellectual property rights. See for example, Wall, David S. (2003). "Policing Elvis: legal action and the shaping of post-mortem celebrity culture as contested space" (PDF). Entertainment and Sports Law, 2 (3): pp. 35–69. His most recent research explores Intellectual Property as a driver of deviant and criminal behaviours, see "The Theft of Ideas as a Cybercrime".

References

External links
 Page at University of Leeds website

Academics of the University of Leeds
British legal scholars
Cybercrime
Year of birth missing (living people)
Living people
Fellows of the Academy of Social Sciences